Kiowa Creek is a  tributary that flows northeast into the South Platte River in Morgan County, Colorado near Orchard.  The creek's source is in the Black Forest of El Paso County, northeast of Colorado Springs, Colorado. Kiowa Creek rises in the highlands of the Colorado Piedmont and is subject to occasional flash floods.

See also
List of rivers of Colorado

References

Rivers of El Paso County, Colorado
Rivers of Morgan County, Colorado
Rivers of Colorado
Tributaries of the Platte River